Ricardo Sérgio Rocha Azevedo (born 3 October 1978), known as Rocha, is a Portuguese former footballer who played mainly as a central defender.

After starting out professionally with Braga he signed for Benfica in late 2001, going on to appear in 157 competitive matches with the latter club. He spent the vast majority of his remaining career in England with Tottenham Hotspur and Portsmouth, for a total of three Premier League seasons.

Club career

Portugal
Rocha was born in Santo Tirso, Porto District. Having made a name for himself with perennial UEFA Cup qualification candidates S.C. Braga and making his Primeira Liga debut during the 1999–2000 season, he moved to S.L. Benfica in December 2001 along with teammates Armando Sá and Tiago (in Rocha's case the move was made official in June of the following year), and eventually developed into a fierce stopper with good marking ability.

During his four and a half seasons with the Lisbon club, Rocha made a total of 157 appearances and scored three goals, which included 33 games in European competitions. He added 25 in the 2004–05 league campaign, as it ended an 11-year drought and conquered the national championship.

On 28 March 2006, Rocha had a widely lauded performance in the UEFA Champions League quarter-finals first leg against eventual champions FC Barcelona, marking Ronaldinho out of the game in a 0–0 home draw and 2–0 aggregate loss.

Tottenham Hotspur
On 17 January 2007, stories hit the Portuguese and English media confirming that a move to Tottenham Hotspur was a possibility. The following day, Portuguese newspapers reported that the move was imminent following a meeting in Lisbon between Tottenham chairman Daniel Levy, former player turned agent Ronny Rosenthal and the Benfica president, with a price of €5 million (£3.2m) plus two friendlies between the clubs, with Benfica receiving all profits from the gate receipts and television money, being arranged.

Rocha was signed by Tottenham for an undisclosed fee thought to be around £3.3 million on a three-and-half-year deal, on 23 January 2007. He played his first game four days later in the 3–1 win over Southend United in the fourth round of the FA Cup, in place of captain Ledley King who was injured at the time; on 10 February he made his first Premier League appearance, against Sheffield United (90 minutes played, 1–2 away loss).

Rocha played just five games in 2007–08, and none whatsoever in all competitions in the following season. He was eventually released on 14 June 2009, after his contract expired.

Portsmouth
On 31 August 2009, Rocha moved to Belgium with Standard Liège on a one-year deal. However, his contract was terminated on 30 January 2010; on 1 February he returned to England, signing for two years with Portsmouth and making his debut in a 5–0 defeat away to Manchester United five days later.

Rocha was sent off in his next two games, against Sunderland on 9 February and late on in his return game against Burnley, on the 27th. Things improved for the defender when he put in a Player of the match performance in his team's FA Cup semi-final victory over former club Tottenham.

In summer 2010, Portsmouth offered Rocha a new contract, and on 4 September he re-signed with the club, with the two-year deal being officially confirmed six days later. He was sent off in two consecutive games, against Reading (2–0 loss) and Cardiff City (3–0 defeat), finishing the season with 29 league appearances as his team ranked in 16th position.

In his second year, both Rocha and Dave Kitson fell out of favor with Steve Cotterill, but the manager left for Nottingham Forest in mid-October 2011. He was awarded the team's Player of the Season award, but they were relegated to Football League One; at the end of the campaign, and upon the expiry of his contract, he was released.

In September 2012, Rocha went on trial at Ipswich Town, but nothing came of it. On 6 October, Leeds United announced that the 34-year-old had been trialling with the club for a period of ten days. On 19 November, however, he re-signed for Portsmouth on an initial one-month contract, extending his link for another one month in January.

Rocha's future with Pompey appeared to be in doubt, after he claimed that he had no contract offer from the club. Additionally, manager Guy Whittingham stated that he refused to rule out giving the player a new deal.

Despite the end of his contract, Rocha expressed desire to make a return to Portsmouth, but left in July 2013 after both parties were unable to reach an agreement. Chairman Iain McInnes explained his return had scuppered, due to wanting a role for "off-the-field role on top of a playing deal by becoming the club's director of football."

International career
After making his debut for Portugal on 20 November 2002 against Scotland, Rocha returned for a friendly with Denmark and a UEFA Euro 2008 qualifier against Finland after a three-year absence, as he was not a regular starter at Benfica then.

Career statistics

Club

International

Honours

Club
Benfica
Primeira Liga: 2004–05
Taça de Portugal: 2003–04
Supertaça Cândido de Oliveira: 2005

Portsmouth
FA Cup runner-up: 2009–10

Individual
Portsmouth Player of The Season: 2011–12

References

External links

1978 births
Living people
People from Santo Tirso
Portuguese footballers
Association football defenders
Primeira Liga players
Segunda Divisão players
F.C. Famalicão players
S.C. Braga B players
S.C. Braga players
S.L. Benfica footballers
Premier League players
English Football League players
Tottenham Hotspur F.C. players
Portsmouth F.C. players
Belgian Pro League players
Standard Liège players
Portugal B international footballers
Portugal international footballers
Portuguese expatriate footballers
Expatriate footballers in England
Expatriate footballers in Belgium
Portuguese expatriate sportspeople in England
Portuguese expatriate sportspeople in Belgium
FA Cup Final players
Sportspeople from Porto District